Ulisse Stefanelli is an Italian mathematician. He is currently professor at the Faculty of Mathematics of the University of Vienna. His research focuses on calculus of variations, partial differential equations, and materials science.

Biography
He holds a Researcher position at the Istituto di Matematica Applicata e Tecnologie Informatiche E. Magenes of the National Research Council (Italy) in Pavia since 2001. In 2013 he has been appointed to the chair of Applied Mathematics and Modeling at the Faculty of Mathematics of the University of Vienna. He has also conducted research at the University of Texas at Austin, the ETH and the University of Zurich, the Weierstrass Institute in Berlin, and the Laboratoire de Mécanique et Génie Civil in Montpellier.

Since 2017 he is the speaker of the  F65 Taming Complexity in Partial Differential Systems funded by the Austrian Science Fund.

Awards
Vinti Prize of the Unione Matematica Italiana (2015)
Richard von Mises Prize of the GAMM (2010)
 of the Alexander von Humboldt Foundation (2009)
ERC Starting Grant (2007)

Selected publications

References

Year of birth missing (living people)
Living people
21st-century Italian mathematicians
University of Pavia alumni
Academic staff of the University of Vienna
Italian academics